The Lawas District is one of the two districts of Limbang Division, Malaysia. The major town is Lawas.

The district area is 3,811.90 square kilometres, and population (year 2020 census) was 46,200.

Lawas is divided into Sundar Sub-District and Trusan Sub-District.

References

External links
 Laman Web Rasmi Majlis Daerah Lawas 

 
Brunei–Malaysia border crossings
Brunei–Malaysia border